Sonja Johannesson is a Swedish ski-orienteering competitor. She won a silver medal in the classic distance at the 1977 World Ski Orienteering Championships in Velingrad, and a silver medal in the relay.

References

Swedish orienteers
Female orienteers
Ski-orienteers
Year of birth missing (living people)
Living people